M167 or M-167 may refer to:

 M167 Vulcan, a towed short-range air defense gun
 M-167 (Michigan highway), a former state highway in Michigan
 M167 (SNP), a gene variation